Jin Se-yeon (born Kim Yoon-jung on February 15, 1994) is a South Korean actress. Some of her notable television dramas are Bridal Mask (2012), Doctor Stranger (2014), Flowers of the Prison (2016), Grand Prince (2018) among others.

Career

2010–2015: Beginnings and finding successes
Jin Se-yeon began her career as an idol trainee for girl group Jewelry under Star Empire Entertainment. Before long, she started to appear in various TV commercials, which then steered her direction into acting. Even though her debut role was in the 2010 SBS drama It's Okay, Daddy's Girl, but her first casting was actually for the 2011 film White: Melody of Death. She then acted in the highly-controversial lesbian-themed Drama Special titled Daughters of Bilitis Club and portrayed the teenage version of Han Ji-hye's female lead character in The Duo.

Her first chance at starring role came when she won the audition for the titular protagonist in the daily drama My Daughter the Flower. She cemented her leading actress status with the acclaimed 1930s-setting period drama, Bridal Mask. Since then, Jin has been starred in various genres, among them a musical melodrama Five Fingers, medical-espionage drama Doctor Stranger, and romantic-comedy film Enemies In-Law.

2016–present: Transition leading roles and rising popularity
In 2016, Jin played the heroine for the summer blockbuster war film, Operation Chromite, alongside Liam Neeson and Lee Jung-jae. She was then chosen as the protagonist for MBC's 55th-founding anniversary historical drama directed by a famed director Lee Byung-hoon, Flowers of the Prison.

In 2018, Jin's popularity started to rise due to her performance in the historical drama Grand Prince. The series was a ratings success, becoming the highest rated TV Chosun drama since the network's establishment in 2011.

In 2019, Jin starred in the fantasy-mystery drama Item as a criminal profiler. The same year she was cast in the historical fantasy drama Queen: Love and War.

In 2020, Jin was cast in the mystery romance drama Born Again alongside Jang Ki-yong and Lee Soo-hyuk.

Personal life
Jin revealed in late 2012 that she had added a year to her real age in her résumé, actually being born in 1994, and not in 1993. Her agency explained, "Jin Se-yeon was only 17 years old when she debuted. She was so young that it was hard for her to land any roles. That's why we added a year to her age."

Jin also denied a rumor that she comes from a wealthy or influential family, due to her being one of the fastest-rising young actresses despite it not being long since her debut. She answered, "I was very surprised by the rumor myself. Though it was for a short period of time, I had also done secondary roles and acted out the younger versions. Maybe that's because I got to play a main role earlier than others. My father is running an IT company that is not listed. I actually don't know very well."

Filmography

Film

Television series

Television shows

Music video

Theater

Discography

Awards and nominations

References

External links
 at Early Bird Entertainment

1994 births
Living people
21st-century South Korean actresses
South Korean television actresses
South Korean film actresses
South Korean web series actresses
People from Seoul
Actresses from Seoul
Chung-Ang University alumni